Nickerie may refer to one of the following locations in Suriname:
 Nickerie District
 Nickerie River
 Nieuw Nickerie, the capital of Nickerie District